The 1951–52 DDR-Oberliga season was the fourth season of the DDR-Oberliga, the top level of ice hockey in East Germany. Seven teams participated in the league, and Chemie Weißwasser won the championship.

Regular season

Final 
 Chemie Weißwasser - Wismut Erz Frankenhausen 6:5 OT

References

External links
East German results 1949-1970

East
DDR-Oberliga (ice hockey) seasons
1951 in East German sport
1952 in East German sport
Ger